Kathleen Kauth is a member of the Nebraska Legislature from Omaha, Nebraska in District 31 who was appointed by Governor Pete Ricketts on June 7, 2022, to fill the seat of former Senator Rich Pahls who died on April 27, 2022. She then won the vote in the midterm election of 2022 to continue as state senator of Nebraska's District 31.

Kauth is the founder of K.T. Beck Enterprises, LLC, which is described as a mediation and conflict coaching firm. She moved to Omaha with her husband and three boys in 2012. Kauth has also served on the State of Nebraska’s Aging Advisory Committee and is currently on the Omaha City Charter Commission. She has been a member of the Eastern Nebraska Office on Aging (ENOA) Foster Grandparents Advisory Board since 2017.

During her tenure as senator, Kauth has sponsored LB574, which "would forbid gender-affirming care such as puberty blockers, hormone therapy and surgeries for those under 19." This bill has been described by opponents as one that "legislates hate and targets trans youth."

Electoral history

References

Republican Party Nebraska state senators
21st-century American politicians
Living people
Year of birth missing (living people)